Renato Brugnoli (born 1 May 1969) is a retired Swiss football midfielder.

References

1969 births
Living people
Swiss men's footballers
FC Schaffhausen players
SC Kriens players
FC Aarau players
FC Zürich players
FC Winterthur players
FC Vaduz players
Swiss expatriate footballers
Swiss expatriate sportspeople in Liechtenstein
Expatriate footballers in Liechtenstein
Association football midfielders